Video random access memory (VRAM) is dedicated computer memory used to store the pixels and other graphics data as a framebuffer to be rendered on a computer monitor. This is often different technology than other computer memory, to facilitate being read rapidly to draw the image. In some systems this memory cannot be read/written using the same methods as normal memory; it is not memory mapped.

Description 

While a computer has system RAM, most contemporary graphics cards have access to a dedicated set of memory known as VRAM. In contrast, a GPU which shares system memory has a Unified Memory Architecture, or shared graphics memory.

System RAM and VRAM has been segregated due to the bandwidth requirements of GPUs, and to achieve lower latency since VRAM is physically closer to the GPU die.

Modern VRAM is found in a BGA package soldered onto the graphics card. Like the GPU itself, the VRAM is cooled by the GPU heatsink.

Technologies 

 Video RAM (dual-ported DRAM), a specific technology used in the 1980s
 GDDR SDRAM
 High Bandwidth Memory (HBM)

See also

 Graphics processing unit
 Tiled rendering, a method to reduce VRAM bandwidth requirements

References

Types of RAM